Cratypedes is a genus of band-winged grasshoppers in the family Acrididae. There are at least two described species in Cratypedes.

Species
These two species belong to the genus Cratypedes:
 Cratypedes lateritius (Saussure, 1884) (Nevada red-winged grasshopper)
 Cratypedes neglectus (Thomas, 1870) (pronotal range grasshopper)

References

Further reading

External links

 

Oedipodinae
Articles created by Qbugbot